The United States Judicial Panel on Multidistrict Litigation (J.P.M.L. or the Panel) is a special body within the United States federal court system which manages multidistrict litigation. If such cases are determined to involve one or more common questions of fact and are transferred, the Panel will then select the district court and assign a judge or judges to preside over the litigation. The purpose of the transfer or "centralization" process is to conserve the resources of the parties and their counsel, as well as the judiciary, thus avoiding duplication of discovery and preventing inconsistent pretrial rulings.

The Chief Justice of the United States, currently John Roberts, appoints the members of the Panel, which is composed of no more than seven United States federal judges serving on either district courts or courts of appeals. All panel members must be from different judicial circuits. In addition to their participation on the Panel, the members continue to serve as judges for the courts to which they were originally appointed. The Panel convenes hearings in various locations around the country to facilitate the participation of parties and their counsel.  The Office of the Clerk of the Panel is located at the Thurgood Marshall Federal Judiciary Building in Washington, D.C.

As of September 30, 2018, the Panel has centralized 1,722 dockets involving more than 673,000 individual cases. There have been 1,131 additional docket requests that were not centralized.  These dockets encompass litigation categories as diverse as securities fraud, drugs and other products liability cases, intellectual property infringement, antitrust law violations, airplane crashes, employment practices and consumer data security breaches.

The Panel also has the additional responsibility of centralizing multicircuit petitions for review: petitions for review of a government agency order or decision which are currently pending in two or more federal courts of appeals.  The Panel has delegated this task to its clerk, who selects a court of appeals by lottery (i.e., spinning a drum and selecting a number at random). Before Congress created the random lottery procedure by statute in 1988, parties litigating in support of and against controversial government agency decisions would race to file in their preferred court of appeals in accordance with the traditional rule that the appropriate venue was usually where a petition for review was first filed.

Current composition of the panel

The following members comprise the panel:

References

External links

Federal judiciary of the United States